John T. Rutherford (August 23, 1823 - August 27, 1898) was a recipient of the Medal of Honor during the American Civil War. Rutherford was born on August 23, 1823 in Russell, New York and died on August 27, 1898 in Chicago, Illinois. He served as a First Lieutenant in the 9th New York Volunteer Cavalry Regiment. Later in the war he reached the rank of Brevet Major. He received his medal for two separate actions at Yellow Tavern on May 11, 1864 and Hanovertown on May 27, 1864. He is buried in Brookside Cemetery, Waddington, New York.

Medal of Honor Citation 
Made a successful charge at Yellow Tavern, Virginia, 11 May 1864, by which 90 prisoners were captured. On 27 May 1864, in a gallant dash on a superior force of the enemy and in a personal encounter, captured his opponent.

Date Issued: March 22, 1892

External links 
https://cdm16694.contentdm.oclc.org/digital/collection/nysmm/id/6296/

References 

1823 births
1898 deaths
People of New York (state) in the American Civil War
American Civil War recipients of the Medal of Honor